Events from the year 2017 in Saint Kitts and Nevis

Incumbents
 Monarch: Elizabeth II
 Governor-General: Tapley Seaton
 Prime Minister: Timothy Harris
 Speaker: Anthony Michael Perkins

Events

Deaths

12 March – Probyn Inniss, governor (b. 1936).

25 March – Sir Cuthbert Sebastian, politician, Governor-General 1996–2013 (b. 1921 ).
31 December – Auckland Hector, cricketer (b. 1945).

References

 
Years of the 21st century in Saint Kitts and Nevis
Saint Kitts and Nevis
Saint Kitts and Nevis
2010s in Saint Kitts and Nevis